.nc is the Internet country code top-level domain (ccTLD) for New Caledonia. Registry operations are managed by the Office des postes et télécommunications.

Restrictions

Only New Caledonian registered companies or associations, or private individuals who are resident in New Caledonia are permitted to register .nc domain names.

Many generic terms are prohibited from registration (those linked with crimes); there are also many reserved for particular circumstances. These include "administration", "bible", "blog", "cabinets", "colonisation", "flag", "justice", "mail", "nation", "offense", "outrage", "presses", "registries",  "temple", "union", "vote" and hundreds more.

Structure
Registrations are taken directly at the second level, or at the third level under two second-level domains.

 asso.nc
 nom.nc

See also 
 Internet in New Caledonia
 Internet in France
 ISO 3166-2:NC
 .fr –CC TLD for France
 .eu –CC TLD for the members of the European Union

References

External links
 IANA .nc whois information
 .nc domain registration website
 OPT

Country code top-level domains
Communications in New Caledonia

sv:Toppdomän#N